Hoevenen Airfield is a small airfield between Antwerp and the Dutch border. It has a grass runway, little hangar space, and a bar/restaurant called Den Buynderdyck. It is home to a flying club Vliegclub Hoevenen and Skydive Antwerp (SDA). Located just outside Antwerp CTR, it is the aerodrome of choice for ULM flyers in this part of the country.

The runway orientation of 15/33 makes it a good place for training cross-wind landings, given the prevailing west winds.

The building of a new clubhouse-cum-hangars had been announced for 2009, this project has been started but made no progress for several years.

References

External links 
 Official AIP maintainer for Belgium (free registration required)
 Vliegclub Hoevenen
 Parajumpers club

Airports in Antwerp Province
Stabroek